Tongibari is an upazila of Munshiganj District in the Division of Dhaka, Bangladesh.

Geography
It has 31346 households and total area 149.96 km2.

Demographics
As of the 1991 Bangladesh census, Tongibari has a population of 176881. Males constitute 52.46% of the population, and females 47.54%. This Upazila's eighteen up population is 83593. Tongibari has an average literacy rate of 35.6% (7+ years), and the national average of 32.4% literate.

Administration
Tongibari Upazila is divided into 12 union parishads: Abdullapur, Arial Baligaon, Autasahi, Betka, Dhipur, Dighirpar, Hasaila Banari, Joslong, Kamarkhara, Kathadia Shimolia, Panchgaon, and Sonarong Tongibari. The union parishads are subdivided into 113 mauzas and 151 villages.

Education

Primary schools
Here is a list of all the primary schools in this Upazila.
Tongibary Model Govt. Primary School
Panchgaon Govt Primary School 
Uttor kurmira Govt Primary School

Secondary schools
Here is a list of all the secondary schools in this Upazila.
SVARNAGRAM R. N. HIGH SCHOOL
PANCHGAON AL-HAZ WAHED ALI DEWAN HIGH SCHOOL
BETKA UNION HIGH SCHOOL
KALMA LAKSHMIKANTA HIGH SCHOOL AND COLLEGE
TONGIBARI PILOT GIRLS' HIGH SCHOOL
KHIDIRPARA HIGH SCHOOL
BANARI HIGH SCHOOL
PURA D. C. HIGH SCHOOL
SONARANG GOVT. PILOT MODEL HIGH SCHOOL
PAIKPARA UNION HIGH SCHOOL
OUTSHAHEE RADHANATH HIGH SCHOOL
DIGHIRPAR A. C. INSTITUTION
BRAHMANBHITA UNION HIGH SCHOOL
ABDULLAPUR HIGH SCHOOL
BALIGAON HIGH SCHOOL
BAZRAJOGINI J. K. HIGH SCHOOL
RONGMAHER HIGH SCHOLL
CHATHATIPARA SHEIKH KABEL ADARSHA HIGH SCHOOL
HAZI ABDUL GONI ABDUL KARIM HIGH SCHOOL
ARIAL SHORNOMAYEE HIGH SCHOOL

Colleges
Here is a list of all the colleges in this Upazila.
Bikrampur Tongibari College

See also
Upazilas of Bangladesh
Districts of Bangladesh
Divisions of Bangladesh

References

 
Upazilas of Munshiganj District